Shabtai Teveth  (1925 – 1 November 2014) was an Israeli historian and author.

Teveth was born in 1925 and grew up in the worker' quarters at the Migdal Tzedek quarry, where his father worked, near Petah Tikva. He began working as a journalist for the newspaper Haaretz in 1950, eventually becoming its political correspondent. In 1981, he was appointed senior research fellow at the Moshe Dayan Center for Middle Eastern and African Studies at Tel Aviv University.

Following the publication of his research into the murder of Haim Arlosoroff, 1982, Menachim Begin - first Israeli Prime Minister elected from the Revisionist movement - ordered a Judicial Commission of Enquiry which concluded that Teveth was wrong to suggest the murder might have been carried out by two Revisionists.

In his biography of David Ben-Gurion, Teveth argues that Ben-Gurion did not instigate a policy of population transfer.

In 2005, Teveth was awarded the Israel Prize for "lifetime achievement and special contribution to society and the State."

Published works
 An account of Israel's Armoured Corps during the 1967 war.
 - Translated from Hebrew to English by Myra Bank (1970).

 Two volumes.

The Incarnations of Transfer in Zionist Thinking 1988. (Hebrew), Ha'aretz.
 Charging Israel With Original Sin (www.commentarymagazine.com/articles/shabtai-teveth/charging-israel-with-original-sin/)

 Two Volumes. Biography of David Ben-Gurion.

Awards 

 1988: National Jewish Book Award in the Israel category for Ben Gurion: The Burning Ground

References

Israeli educators
Israeli historians
Jewish Israeli writers
Israeli journalists
Jewish historians
1925 births
2014 deaths
Zionists
Israel Prize in literature recipients